Gregory K. Anderson is a United States Army major general who serves as commanding general of the 10th Mountain Division since September 9, 2022. He was the Director of Operations and Cyber of the United States Africa Command from July 2021 to August 2022. He previously was the Deputy Director of Strategy, Plans, and Policy of the United States Central Command from June 2019 to June 2021.

References

Living people
Place of birth missing (living people)
Recipients of the Defense Superior Service Medal
Recipients of the Legion of Merit
United States Army generals
United States Army personnel of the Iraq War
United States Army personnel of the War in Afghanistan (2001–2021)
Year of birth missing (living people)